Zrinjevac Sport Hall is an indoor arena in Osijek, Croatia. Besides for sports events it is also used for concerts.

It has capacity of 1,160 seats and it is one of bigger sport venues in Osijek (after Gradski vrt stadium and Gradski vrt Hall).

The hall was built in 1973 and opened on 26 December that year.

References 

Indoor arenas in Croatia
Handball venues in Croatia
Basketball venues in Croatia
Sports venues completed in 1973
Sports venues in Osijek
1973 establishments in Croatia